The Cooper Creek (formerly Cooper's Creek) is a river in the Australian states of Queensland and South Australia. It was the site of the death of the explorers Burke and Wills in 1861. It is sometimes known as the Barcoo River from one of its tributaries and is one of three major Queensland river systems that flow into the Lake Eyre basin. The flow of the creek depends on monsoonal rains falling months earlier and many hundreds of kilometres away in eastern Queensland.

History

Indigenous Australians have inhabited the area for at least 50,000 years, with over 25 tribal groups living in the Channel Country area alone. A vast trade network had been established running from north to south with goods such as ochre sent north with shells and pituri moved south. Birdsville was once a major meeting place for conducting ceremonies and trade.

Charles Sturt named the river in 1845 after Charles Cooper, the Chief Justice of South Australia. It was along Cooper Creek that the explorers Burke and Wills died in 1861. John King survived the expedition with the assistance of friendly Aboriginal people. Only ten years after the explorers' deaths, homesteads were being established on the watercourse. A station at Innamincka was the first permanent settlement in the area.

By 1880 the reliable water source had attracted more settlers to the point where the whole area was taken up and stocked with cattle. This led to the displacement of local people from their traditional lands. By 1900 the population had reduced to 30 survivors, just 10% of the original number, as influenza and measles took their toll.

The waterway does not experience regular seasonal floods.

Course
It rises west of the Great Dividing Range on low ground as two central Queensland rivers, the Thomson between Longreach and Charters Towers, and the Barcoo in the area east of Tambo.

Cooper Creek spreads out into a vast area of anastomosing ephemeral channels, making its way roughly south into the far south-west corner of Queensland before turning due west into South Australia towards Lake Eyre.  In most years, it is absorbed into the earth, goes to fill channels and the many permanent waterholes and lakes such as Lake Yamma Yamma, or simply evaporates without reaching Lake Eyre.

In very wet years, however, it manages to flood the entire Channel Country and reaches Lake Eyre after flowing through the dry areas of Strzelecki Desert, Sturt Stony Desert and the Tirari Desert. This is because much more water is absorbed along its course than with the Diamantina or Georgina, but may also be because of centennial or multicentennial wet and dry cycles in those basins causing them to regularly reach the lake during wet periods (there is some evidence from terraces around Lake Eyre that this occurred during the Medieval Warm Period).

Land use
Most of the basin of the Cooper is used for sheep and cattle grazing on natural grasslands: although the extreme east of the basin is relatively wet with averages of over 500 mm (20 inches) at Blackall, the rainfall is much too erratic for cropping. The soils are mainly Vertisols or Vertic Torrifluvents and are quite fertile, though generally heavy in texture with a strong tendency to crack due to the erratic rainfall.

See also

Cooper Creek catfish
Cooper Floodplain below Windorah
List of rivers of Australia
Yapunyah waterhole

References

External links 
 Aerial Video of the Cooper Creek at Innamincka
 Australian Society for Limnology
 Primary Industries and Resources SA - Cooper and Diamantina
 Floods of Lake Eyre
 Gerald Nanson Channel Country
 Department of the Environment and Heritage

Rivers of Queensland
Rivers of South Australia
Lake Eyre basin
Central West Queensland
South West Queensland
Far North (South Australia)